Zhucheng is a county-level city in the southeast of Shandong province, People's Republic of China. It is under the administration of Weifang city and had at the 2010 census a population of 1,086,222 even though its built-up (or metro) area is much smaller.

History
Zhucheng was originally known as Langya. It was from here that Emperor Qin Shi Huang sent Xu Fu to sail towards Japan in 210 BC, in pursuit of the elixir of youth.

Song dynasty 
During the Song Dynasty, Zhucheng was known as Dongwu. Major figures who hailed from the area during the Song Dynasty include painter Zhang Zeduan, and Zhao Mingcheng.

Ming dynasty 
Wan Zhen'er, a famous concubine to Hongzhi Emperor, was born in Zhucheng.

Qing dynasty 

People's Republic of China 
A number of Mao-era figures hailed from Zhucheng, including Mao Zedong's last wife and leader of the Gang of Four, Jiang Qing, as well as Kang Sheng. , former vice-governor of Anhui province, is a native of Zhucheng.

On January 31, 2021, the Zhucheng city government reported that a number of residents in  experienced symptoms of gas poisoning due to illegal discharge of chemical waste in the city. On February 2, city authorities detained 16 suspects, and stated that the discharge had killed 4 people, and poisoned at least 37.

Administration
Zhucheng was upgraded to a county-level city in 1987 and is administered as a provincial-level economic development district, and had jurisdiction over 3 subdistricts and 10 towns.

Subdistricts

Towns

Former divisions 
Former Towns are merged to others include Lübiao, Wanjiazhuang, Qiankou, Mengtuan, Mazhuang, Chenggezhuang, Jiutai, Guojiatun, Zhujie, Haogezhuang and Wadian. Wadian has been merged into Linjia Village and is now Wadian community.

Former Townships are merged to others include Taolin, Wujialou, Taoyuan, Shihetou, Shimen, and Shandongtou.

Climate

Economy
In 2005, Zhucheng had a total output value of RMB 20.8 billion and an average annual growth rate of 16%. Zhucheng is projected to continue its 16% annual growth rate and attain a total output value of RMB 43.6 billion by 2010.

Economic Development Zone
The Zhucheng Industrial Park was approved by the Shandong Provincial Government in 1992. Its total area spans . As of 2001, industries based at the zone included food processing, chemicals, building materials, textiles and electromechanical products, and 2001 annual total industrial output was 2 billion yuan, with the added industrial value of 350 million yuan. For 2001, exports were US$68.92 million, and revenue was 83.17 million yuan.

Transportation
Zhucheng is about an hour's drive from Qingdao city.

Dinosaur city 

Zhucheng has been an important site for dinosaur excavation since 1960. The local community is known to use calcium rich fossils for traditional village remedies used to treat muscle cramps and other minor ailments. The world's largest hadrosaurid fossil was found in Zhucheng in the 1980s and is on display in the local museum. The city has also been a place for smuggling of dinosaur bones; in January 2008, Australia returned hundreds of kilograms of Chinese dinosaur fossils, including dinosaur fossil eggs. These fossils were recovered during a sting operation carried out on warehouses and cargo containers.

The ceratopsian Zhuchengceratops (2010), sauropod Zhuchengtitan (2017) and theropod Zhuchengtyrannus (2011) have been described from deposits near and named after Zhucheng.

2008 discovery 
On 31 December 2008, palaeontologists from the Institute of Vertebrate Paleontology and Paleoanthropology of Chinese Academy of Sciences announced they have unearthed 7,600 dinosaur fossils since March 2008 around Zhucheng. The latest sites to be discovered are near the towns of Longdu, Shunwang, Jiayue and Zhigou. The palaeontologists believe they have found one of the biggest sites of dinosaur remains from a massive excavation pit. The fossilized bones date to the late Late Cretaceous just prior to the Cretaceous–Paleogene extinction event. The findings also include the remains of a  hadrosaurid, a record size for the duck-billed dinosaur. A fossilized skull of a large ceratopsian was also found along with bones which belong to club-tailed ankylosaurs.

According to Professor Zhao Xijin, a palaeontologist in charge of the excavations from the Institute of Vertebrate Paleontology and Paleoanthropology, "This group of fossilised dinosaurs is currently the largest ever discovered in the world... in terms of area."

Such a high concentration of fossil bones in such a small area is significant for the theories of extinction of dinosaurs. A detailed scientific journal on the fossils is expected to be published later in 2009. Excavations are currently suspended for the winter but will resume when the weather gets warmer. Scientists believe a volcanic eruption may have killed the dinosaurs, and a subsequent flood carried the fossils to Zhucheng, which may have been a wetland covered in grass.

The local authorities in Shandong are making plans to set up a fossil park in the area.

Demographic and culture

Zhucheng is heavily industrialized and is one of the few dozen cities of China exceeding a million inhabitants. The major ethnic groups comprising the city include Han Chinese (99.7%), Manchu (0.1%), Korean (0.1%) and Hui (0.1%). The city has a Christian population of approximately of 19,000 (1.8%). Based on a census from the year 1990, the city had 523,425 males and 507,233 females with 260,678 households. Zhucheng's sister city is Belleville, Ontario, Canada.

References

External links

Official website
Brief introduction
Zhucheng Dinosaur Museum

 
Cities in Shandong
Paleontology in Shandong
Weifang